Olden Polynice (born November 21, 1964) is a Haitian former professional basketball player. He played center for the Seattle SuperSonics, Los Angeles Clippers, Detroit Pistons, Sacramento Kings, and Utah Jazz of the National Basketball Association (NBA).

Career
After graduating from All Hallows High School in the Bronx, Polynice played college basketball at the University of Virginia.

As a Freshman during the 1983–84 season, Polynice helped lead the UVA Cavaliers to the NCAA final four when they won the NCAA Eastern Region as the # 7 seed. UVA defeating the #10 seed Iona (58–57), the #2 seed Arkansas (53–51 in OT), the #3 seed Syracuse (63–55) and the #4 seed Indiana (50–48) en route to the final four. In the final four, UVA lost in overtime 49–47 to the Midwest Region Champion University of Houston denying UVA a chance at the National Championship game.   
As a Junior during the 1985–86 season, Polynice was honored for his play by being named first team All-ACC.

After three years in college and playing with Serie A's Hamby Rimini in 1986–87, he was selected 8th overall by the Chicago Bulls in the 1987 NBA Draft, but was immediately traded to the Seattle SuperSonics for Scottie Pippen. Polynice then arrived in Detroit in 1992 after being traded by the Los Angeles Clippers and departed two years later when he was traded to the Sacramento Kings for Pete Chilcutt and two draft picks.

In 15 NBA seasons, Polynice averaged 23.5 minutes, 7.8 points and 6.7 rebounds per game, with a career PER of 13.2. At 6'11", he was often signed by teams in need of a rebounder and interior player, and consistently ranked among the league leaders in offensive rebounds. Polynice retired from the NBA in 2004 after a brief return to the Clippers. He later played for the Los Angeles Aftershock of the ABA.

Upon retiring, Polynice served as coach for the ABA's Long Beach Breakers. In 1997, still active, he worked as a color commentator for the WNBA's Sacramento Monarchs.

He now runs a basketball training camp called NextStar Basketball. His nephew Eniel Polynice, who went undrafted in 2011, currently plays for the Atleticos de San German in the BSN of Puerto Rico.

Personal life
In a two month span in 2000, Polynice was arrested twice for impersonating a police officer.CBS News - Polynice pinched again

Career statistics

NBA

Source

Regular season

|-
| style="text-align:left;"| 
| style="text-align:left;"| Seattle
| 82 || 0 || 13.2 || .465 || .000 || .639 || 4.0 || .4 || .4 || .3 || 4.1
|-
| style="text-align:left;"| 
| style="text-align:left;"| Seattle
| 80 || 0 || 10.4 || .506 || .000 || .593 || 2.6 || .3 || .5 || .4 || 2.9
|-
| style="text-align:left;"| 
| style="text-align:left;"| Seattle
| 79 || 7 || 13.7 || .540 || .500 || .475 || 3.8 || .2 || .3 || .3 || 4.6
|-
| style="text-align:left;"| 
| style="text-align:left;"| Seattle
| 48 || 0 || 20.0 || .545 || – || .588 || 5.6 || .3 || .5 || .4 || 8.3
|-
| style="text-align:left;"| 
| style="text-align:left;"| L.A. Clippers
| 31 || 30 || 36.5 || .579 || .000 || .572 || 9.1 || .8 || .5 || .4 || 12.3
|-
| style="text-align:left;"| 
| style="text-align:left;"| L.A. Clippers
| 76 || 65 || 24.1 || .519 || .000 || .622 || 7.1 || .6 || .6 || .3 || 8.1
|-
| style="text-align:left;"| 
| style="text-align:left;"| Detroit
| 67 || 18 || 19.4 || .490 || .000 || .465 || 6.2 || .4 || .5 || .3 || 7.3
|-
| style="text-align:left;"| 
| style="text-align:left;"| Detroit
| 37 || 36 || 36.5 || .547 || .000 || .457 || 12.3 || .6 || .6 || 1.0 || 13.1
|-
| style="text-align:left;"| 
| style="text-align:left;"| Sacramento
| 31 || 29 || 33.9 || .484 || .000 || .556 || 11.4 || .6 || .6 || 1.0 || 9.8
|-
| style="text-align:left;"| 
| style="text-align:left;"| Sacramento
| 81 || 81 || 31.3 || .544 || 1.000 || .639 || 9.0 || .8 || .6 || .6 || 10.8
|-
| style="text-align:left;"| 
| style="text-align:left;"| Sacramento
| 81 || 80 || 30.1 || .527 || .333 || .601 || 9.4 || .7 || .6 || .8 || 12.2
|-
| style="text-align:left;"| 
| style="text-align:left;"| Sacramento
| 82 || style="background:#CFECEC; width:1em"|82* || 35.3 || .457 || .000 || .562 || 9.4 || 2.2 || .6 || 1.0 || 12.5
|-
| style="text-align:left;"| 
| style="text-align:left;"| Sacramento
| 70 || 25 || 20.8 || .459 || .000 || .452 || 6.3 || 1.5 || .5 || .6 || 7.9
|-
| style="text-align:left;"| 
| style="text-align:left;"| Seattle
| 48 || 47 || 30.9 || .472 || 1.000 || .309 || 8.9 || .9 || .4 || .6 || 7.7
|-
| style="text-align:left;"| 
| style="text-align:left;"| Utah
| 82 || 79 || 22.2 || .510 || .500 || .311 || 5.5 || .5 || .4 || 1.0 || 5.3
|-
| style="text-align:left;"| 
| style="text-align:left;"| Utah
| 81 || 79 || 20.0 || .496 || .000 || .262 || 4.7 || .4 || .3 || 1.0 || 5.3
|-
| style="text-align:left;"| 
| style="text-align:left;"| L.A. Clippers
| 2 || 0 || 6.0 || – || – || – || 1.0 || .5 || .5 || .0 || .0
|- class="sortbottom"
| style="text-align:center;" colspan="2"| Career
| 1,058 || 658 || 23.5 || .505 || .192 || .535 || 6.7 || .7 || .5 || .6 || 7.8

Playoffs

|-
| style="text-align:left;"| 1988
| style="text-align:left;"| Seattle
| 5 || 0 || 8.8 || .455 || – || .000 || 1.6 || .0 || .6 || .0 || 2.0
|-
| style="text-align:left;"| 1989
| style="text-align:left;"| Seattle
| 8 || 0 || 20.3 || .610 || – || .538 || 7.8 || .1 || .8 || .5 || 7.1
|-
| style="text-align:left;"| 1992
| style="text-align:left;"| L.A. Clippers
| 5 || 0 || 12.6 || .583 || – || .333 || 3.6 || .4 || .2 || .2 || 3.2
|-
| style="text-align:left;"| 1995
| style="text-align:left;"| Sacramento
| 4 || 4 || 35.3 || .522 || 1.000 || .667 || 12.0 || .8 || .3 || 1.8 || 13.8
|-
| style="text-align:left;"| 2000
| style="text-align:left;"| Utah
| 10 || 10 || 26.0 || .538 || – || .500 || 6.6 || .5 || .3 || .8 || 5.9
|-
| style="text-align:left;"| 2001
| style="text-align:left;"| Utah
| 5 || 5 || 20.0 || .533 || .000 || .700 || 3.8 || .2 || .2 || .4 || 7.8
|-
|- class="sortbottom"
| style="text-align:center;" colspan="2"| Career
| 37 || 19 || 20.8 || .547 || .500 || .543 || 6.0 || .3 || .4 || .6 || 6.4

College

|-
|style="text-align:left;"|1983–84
|style="text-align:left;"|Virginia
|33||||26.2|||.551||||.588||5.6||0.6||0.1||0.5||7.7
|-
|style="text-align:left;"|1984–85
|style="text-align:left;"|Virginia
|32||||34.2|||.603||||.599||7.6||0.5||0.4||1.1||13.0
|-
|style="text-align:left;"|1985–86
|style="text-align:left;"|Virginia
|30||||35.8|||.572||||.637||8.0||0.5||0.3||1.1||16.1
|-
|- class="sortbottom"
|style="text-align:left;"|Career
|style="text-align:left;"|
|95||||31.9|||.578||||.612||7.0||0.5||0.3||0.9||12.1
|}

References

External links
NBA.com profile
NBA.com historical playerfile
College stats at sportsstats.com
NBA Stats

1964 births
Living people
American Basketball Association (2000–present) coaches
Basket Rimini Crabs players
Centers (basketball)
Chicago Bulls draft picks
Detroit Pistons players
Grand Rapids Hoops players
Haitian emigrants to the United States
Haitian men's basketball players
Harlem Globetrotters players
Long Beach Jam players
Los Angeles Clippers players
Michigan Mayhem players
National Basketball Association players from Haiti
Sacramento Kings players
Seattle SuperSonics players
Sportspeople from Port-au-Prince
Utah Jazz players
Virginia Cavaliers men's basketball players